Martin Knight may refer to:

 Martin Knight (author) (born 1957), British author
 Martin Knight (cricketer) (born 1984), English cricketer
 Martin Knight (squash player) (born 1983), New Zealand squash player
 Martin Knight (rower) (born 1957), British rower